Sir William Hargreaves Leese, 2nd Baronet,  (24 August 1868 – 17 January 1937) was an English first-class cricketer and barrister.

The son of the cricketer and politician Sir Joseph Leese, he was born in August 1868 at Send, Surrey. He was educated at Winchester College, where he played for the cricket eleven. From Winchester he went up to Trinity Hall, Cambridge. During his studies at Cambridge, Leese played first-class cricket for the  Marylebone Cricket Club against Cambridge University at Fenner's in 1889, and Oxford University at Lord's in 1890. He scored 57 runs in these two matches, with a highest score of 35. Leese was an enthusiastic amateur actor when at Cambridge and was closely associated with the Footlights.

A student of the Inner Temple, he was called to the bar in 1893. In December of the same year he married Violet Mary Sandeman. He continued his interest in acting after leaving Cambridge. His association with I Zingari led to him performing for the Old Stagers at the Canterbury Cricket Week; he was additionally associated with the Windsor Strollers. By 1905, Leese was a partner in the legal firm Freshfields & Co., who were solicitors for the Bank of England. He succeeded to the Smyth baronetcy as the 2nd Baronet upon the death of his father in July 1914. He held the additional post of justice of the peace for Hertfordshire. Leese died in January 1937 at Sidmouth. He was succeeded as the 3rd Baronet by his son, Sir Oliver Leese, who commanded the Eighth Army and 11th Army Group in the final years of the Second World War. From a cricketing family, his brothers Vernon and Neville both played first-class cricket, as did his uncle Ernest Leese.

References

External links

1868 births
1937 deaths
People from the Borough of Guildford
Baronets in the Baronetage of the United Kingdom
People educated at Winchester College
Alumni of Trinity Hall, Cambridge
19th-century English male actors
English male stage actors
English cricketers
Marylebone Cricket Club cricketers
Members of the Inner Temple
English barristers
English solicitors
English justices of the peace